Alef Poh-ji (born 13 April 1987), or simply known as Lef is a Thai retired professional footballer who plays as a midfielder.

Honours

Club
Thai Port
 Thai FA Cup: 2009
 Thai League Cup: 2010

Buriram
 Thai Division 1 League:  2011

External links
 Profile at Goal

References

1987 births
Living people
Alef Poh-ji
Alef Poh-ji
Alef Poh-ji
Alef Poh-ji
Association football midfielders
Alef Poh-ji
Alef Poh-ji
Alef Poh-ji
Alef Poh-ji
Alef Poh-ji
Alef Poh-ji
Alef Poh-ji
Alef Poh-ji